Arianiello is a village in the municipality of Lapio, province of Avellino, Campania, Italy.

Arianiello is 585 meters above sea level.

Cities and towns in Campania